Salvo is the given name of:

People
Salvo Andò (born 1945), Italian academic and politician
Salvo Cuccia (born 1960), Italian cinema director and screenwriter
Salvo D'Acquisto (1920–1943), Italian Carabinieri who sacrificed himself to save 22 civilians from a German firing squad
Salvatore Lima (1928–1992), Italian politician murdered by the Mafia; often referred to as Salvo Lima
Salvatore Salvo Randone (1906–1991), Italian actor

Fictional characters
Salvo (G.I. Joe), in the G.I. Joe universe
Salvo Montalbano, a detective in Andrea Camilleri's series of novels and short stories

See also
Salvatore